Andy Hawthorne is a professional racquetball player (born September 7, 1982). Hawthorne finished #6 on the International Racquetball Tour (IRT) at the end of the 2010-11 season, a career high and the fourth season he'd finished in the IRT's top 10 players. Primarily a drive serving player, Hawthorne also has a very "scrappy" game style.

Professional career 

Hawthorne began playing the IRT full-time in the 2004-05 season, when he played 9 of the 12 events and reached the quarter finals twice. Since then Hawthorne hasn't missed a tournament, reaching the quarter finals 28 times but only once advancing to the semi-finals, which was at the Kansas City Pro-Am in September 2011, when he lost to Kane Waselenchuk in three games.

International career 

Hawthorne has been on Team USA at three international events. He and Jason Samora were silver medalists in doubles at the 2007 Pan American Championships in Chile, losing to Canadians Vincent Gagnon and François Viens in the final.

In his other Team USA appearances, Hawthorne was a bronze medalist in singles at the 2009 Pan American Championships, and in 2011, he lost to Bolivian Carlos Keller in the Round of 16.

USA Racquetball competitions 

Hawthorne won the USA Racquetball collegiate men's doubles title in 2002 and 2003 with Shane Vanderson, when he represented Baldwin-Wallace College.  In 2002, Hawthorne also won the collegiate mixed title with Krystal Csuk.

Personal 

Born in Clinton, Iowa, Hawthorne grew up in Champaign, Illinois, close to a racquetball club. He learned to play from his uncle on a family vacation, and then continued to play when he returned home.

Hawthorne is married, and met his wife Tracy at Baldwin-Wallace College as he was looking to recruit women for the racquetball team there. She continues to play racquetball competitively.

Hawthorne has been sponsored by Ektelon throughout his career.

See also 

List of racquetball players
IRT Website

References 

American racquetball players
Living people
1982 births
People from Clinton, Iowa
Baldwin Wallace University alumni
Sportspeople from Champaign, Illinois
People from Cuyahoga County, Ohio